Laxey Railway Station (Manx: Stashoon Raad Yiarn Laksaa)  is an interchange station in the village of Laxey on the east coast of the Isle of Man. It is the principal intermediate station on the Manx Electric Railway (3' 0" (914 mm) gauge) as well as being the lower terminus of the Snaefell Mountain Railway (3' 6" (1067 mm) gauge, to accommodate a central braking rail). It is thus the island's only dual-gauge station, albeit with completely separate tracks. Some MER services from/to Douglas terminate here.

Facilities
The tin-roofed station building dates from the early years of the line and features the station name in large lettering painted on its roof. This building houses a booking office and a café as well as the station toilets, and was extensively refurbished in 1994, marking the centenary of the tram service to the village, though not on this site.

Re-siting
The first terminal was located on the site of today's sub-station, whilst the viaduct (at the southern end of the station) was constructed to bridge the gap over the Glen Roy below.

See also
 Manx Electric Railway stations

References

Sources

 Manx Electric Railway Stopping Places (2002) Manx Electric Railway Society
 Island Images: Manx Electric Railway Pages (2003) Jon Wornham
 Official Tourist Department Page (2009) Isle Of Man Heritage Railways

Railway stations in the Isle of Man
Manx Electric Railway
Railway stations opened in 1894